Steve Kaplan (born March 25, 1960) is an American entrepreneur, author, public speaker.

Start of career
Kaplan built SCA- a 1300 employee, international marketing firm  -before selling it to Snyder Communications(NYSE: SNC). In January 2000, SNC officially launched Bounty SCA Worldwide a division that organizes the marketing services businesses it has acquired over the previous few years. Kaplan served as the CEO of Bounty SCA Worldwide under Snyder Communications which was sold to Havas.

Books
Kaplan went on to write about these experiences of starting, building and selling SCA. He is the author of  Bag the Elephant, Be the Elephant, and Sell Your Business for the Max. Bag the Elephant received the Benjamin Franklin Award as the Business Book of the Year.

Bibliography
Bag the Elephant!: How to Win and Keep Big Customers. Published by Bard Press, 2005. .
Be the Elephant: Build A Bigger, Better, Business. Published by Workman Publishing Company Inc., 2006. .
Sell Your Business for the Max! Published by Workman Publishing Company, Inc., 2009. .

Secret Millionaire
Kaplan appeared on ABC's show Secret Millionaire where he travels to the south side of Chicago to donate money to charities in need.

Military tour
In 2013, Kaplan joined “Operation Hot.” Along with Chef Charles Carroll, Chef Robert Irvine, and others, he toured Afghanistan speaking to troops on getting jobs and starting businesses to better prepare them for redeployment back to the US.

World Arm Wrestling League
Kaplan currently is the President of the World Arm Wrestling League LLC and the Commissioner of the World Arm Wrestling League (WAL).

Business ventures
Kaplan is a minority owner in eSports team Immortals.

References

1960 births
Living people
21st-century American businesspeople
Esports team owners